The 2008 IIFA Awards, officially known as the 9th International Indian Film Academy Awards ceremony, presented by the International Indian Film Academy honoured the best films of 2007 and took place between 6 – 8 June 2008. The official ceremony took place on 8 June 2008, at the Siam Paragon in Bangkok, Thailand. During the ceremony, IIFA Awards were awarded in 27 competitive categories. The ceremony was televised in India and internationally on Star Plus. Actors Boman Irani and Ritesh Deshmukh co-hosted the ceremony for the first time.

The IIFA Music and Fashion Extravaganza took place on 7 June 2008, as did the FICCI-IIFA Global Business Forum. On 6 June, The IIFA World Premiere was held at Major Cineplex, Bangkok which showcased Sarkar Raj, starring Indian Film icons Amitabh Bachchan, Abhishek Bachchan and Aishwarya Rai Bachchan, directed by Ram Gopal Varma.

Chak De! India led the ceremony with 14 nominations, followed by Guru and Om Shanti Om with 10 nominations each, and Bhool Bhulaiyaa and Life in a... Metro with 9 nominations each.

Chak De! India won 9 awards, including Best Film, Best Director (for Shimit Amin), Best Actor (for Shah Rukh Khan), thus becoming the most-awarded film at the ceremony.

Om Shanti Om won 6 awards. Other multiple winners included Life in a... Metro with 3 awards and Guru, Jab We Met, Saawariya and Shootout at Lokhandwala with 2 awards each. In addition, Partner received 1 award at the ceremony.

Konkona Sen Sharma received dual nominations for Best Supporting Actress for her performances in Laaga Chunari Mein Daag and Life in a... Metro, winning for the latter.

Winners and nominees
Winners are listed first and highlighted in boldface.

Popular awards

Musical awards

Backstage awards

Technical awards

Special awards

Style Diva of the Year
 Katrina Kaif

Style Icon of the Year
 Abhishek Bachchan

Fresh Face of the Year
 Neil Nitin Mukesh

Outstanding Contribution to Indian Cinema
 Shyam Benegal

Outstanding Contribution by an Indian in International Cinema
 A. R. Rahman

Achievement in Indian Cinema
 Mumtaz

Multiple nominations and awards

The following eleven films received multiple nominations:
 Fourteen: Chak De! India
 Ten: Guru and Om Shanti Om
 Nine: Life in a... Metro and Bhool Bhulaiyaa
 Seven: Jab We Met and Partner
 Six: Saawariya
 Three: Cheeni Kum and Shootout at Lokhandwala
 Two: Aaja Nachle and Bheja Fry

The following four films received multiple awards:
 Nine: Chak De! India
 Six: Om Shanti Om
 Three:Life in a... Metro
 Two: Jab We Met, Shootout at Lokhandwala, Guru and Saawariya

References

Iifa Awards
IIFA awards